Ripley Under Ground is a psychological thriller by Patricia Highsmith, the second novel in her Ripliad series. It was published in June 1970.

Plot summary 

Six years after the events of  The Talented Mr. Ripley, Tom Ripley is now in his early 30s, living a comfortable life in France with his heiress wife, Héloïse Plisson. The lifestyle at his estate, Belle Ombre, is supported by Dickie Greenleaf's fortune, occasional fence work with an American named Reeves Minot, and Derwatt Ltd. — an art forgery scheme that he helped set up years before as a silent partner. 

Years prior, after the painter Philip Derwatt disappeared and committed suicide in Greece, his friends — photographer Jeff Constant and freelance journalist Ed Banbury — began to publicize his work and sold a number of authentic paintings. Thanks to their PR efforts, Derwatt became more famous and his paintings more valuable. When the original Derwatts began to run out, Ripley went into business with them and convinced Bernard Tufts, another painter, to produce forged Derwatts. The money is rolling in, but Tufts, who had idolized Derwatt, is plagued by guilt for his role in the scheme.

Derwatt Ltd. is threatened by a disgruntled American collector, Thomas Murchison, who surmises that one of his Derwatts is a forgery. Worried that the lid is about to be blown on the whole scheme, Ripley decides to go to London and impersonate Derwatt, meet with Murchison, and convince him that the paintings are genuine. Ripley is unsuccessful, however, particularly as Tufts meets with Murchison and tells him not to buy any more Derwatts. Ripley, as himself, invites Murchison to Belle Ombre to inspect his own Derwatt painting (also a fake) to try to persuade him from taking the case to a Tate Gallery curator and the police.

Murchison inspects Ripley's painting and believes it is also a fake. Realizing that the argument is futile, Ripley comes clean on the entire scam, asking for mercy for Tufts' sake. Murchison refuses, however, so Ripley kills him. He abandons Murchison's suitcase and painting at Orly Airport, then buries his body in the woods near Belle Ombre. Later, Dickie's cousin Chris comes to stay while on a European tour. He notices the fresh grave outside the house, but doesn't think much of it. Tufts also visits Ripley, rattled by the recent events and saying he wants to confess everything to the police. Ripley tells Tufts that he killed Murchison and, realizing his own terrible choice of a gravesite, asks him to help move the body. Together, they dump the corpse in a river.

The French police, together with Inspector Webster from the Met, investigate Murchison's disappearance, making trips to Belle Ombre and inspecting the property. Tufts leaves a hanging effigy in the cellar that is discovered by Héloïse, along with a note suggesting that he is going to confess. When he returns to Belle Ombre, Tufts unsuccessfully tries to strangle Ripley, who feels pity for the disturbed man and does not retaliate. Later, Tufts knocks Ripley out with a shovel and buries him alive in Murchison's empty grave. Ripley manages to escape and returns to London to impersonate Derwatt for a second appearance, this time for Webster and Murchison's wife. Mrs. Murchison decides to pay a visit to Belle Ombre, the last place her husband was seen.

Back at Belle Ombre, Ripley entertains Mrs. Murchison. After she leaves, Ripley realizes that Tufts is contemplating suicide. Feeling responsible, Ripley searches for him in Greece, Paris, and finally Salzburg. There, he finds Tufts, but the painter believes Ripley is a ghost - he thinks he killed him in France. Tufts runs from Ripley and leaps off a cliff to his death. Ripley uses the corpse to tie up loose ends; he partially cremates and buries the body, making sure to smash or hide any teeth. He then goes to the police with the information that Derwatt killed himself there. Seeing suicidal journal entries, the police presume that Tufts also killed himself in Salzburg by jumping off a bridge. 

With Bernard and Derwatt both gone, the art forgery allegations have no active leads and Derwatt Ltd.'s existence is no longer in jeopardy. The novel ends with Ripley's being content in bed with Héloïse, who prefers to remain ignorant of what he has done and, further, how exactly he makes his money. He receives an optimistic-sounding call from the gallery showcasing the forged Derwatts, but still fears that the next one will be from the police, who have noticed that people tend to die after meeting Ripley.

Reception

According to Michael Dirda, Ripley Under Ground considers authenticity, and the difference between appearance and reality. As Ripley admires a pair of Derwatt paintings on his walls, he actually comes to prefer the forgery over the genuine artwork. Dirda notes, "Fakery, though, suffuses every page of Ripley Under Ground. Tom pretends to be Derwatt. Murchison appears to catch a plane at Orly. An effigy of Bernard is found hanging by its neck. A supposedly dead man rises from his grave. Bernard is haunted by what seems a ghost. In this counterfeit world only the pragmatic Tom thrives, for he alone recognizes that there is no distinction that matters between what is real and what is only apparently real."

Adaptations

Film
 The 1977 film The American Friend, primarily based on Ripley's Game, also uses plot elements of Ripley Under Ground.
 The novel was filmed in 2005: Ripley Under Ground stars Barry Pepper as Ripley and features Willem Dafoe, Alan Cumming, and Tom Wilkinson in supporting roles. The film was directed by Roger Spottiswoode.

Television
 Parts of the novel were adapted in "A Gift for Murder", a 1982 episode of The South Bank Show. Jonathan Kent plays Ripley, and Patricia Highsmith herself cameos.

Radio
 The 2009 BBC Radio 4 adaptation stars Ian Hart as Ripley.

References 

1970 American novels
Novels by Patricia Highsmith
American novels adapted into films
Novels set in France
Novels about serial killers
American novels adapted into television shows
Heinemann (publisher) books